Sclerodoris is a genus of sea slugs, specifically dorid nudibranchs. They are marine gastropod molluscs in the family Discodorididae.

Species
Species so far described in this genus include:

Sclerodoris apiculata (Alder & Hancock, 1864)
Sclerodoris coriacea Eliot, 1904
Sclerodoris japonica (Eliot, 1913)
Sclerodoris minor Eliot, 1904
Sclerodoris paliensis Bertsch & S. Johnson, 1982
Sclerodoris prea (Ev. Marcus & Er. Marcus, 1967)
Sclerodoris rubicunda (Baba, 1949)
Sclerodoris tanya (Ev. Marcus, 1971)
Sclerodoris tarka Burn, 1969
Sclerodoris trenberthi (Burn, 1962)
Sclerodoris tuberculata Eliot, 1904
Sclerodoris virgulata Valdés, 2001
Sclerodoris worki (Ev. Marcus & Er. Marcus, 1967)

Synonyms
 Sclerodoris rubra is a synonym of Sclerodoris tuberculata

References

Discodorididae